Taghmon was a constituency represented in the Irish House of Commons until its abolition on 1 January 1801.

Members of Parliament
1634–1635 David Hore of Harperstown and Thomas Roche
1639–1649: Richard Barnewall (expelled for non-attendance)
1661–1666 John Cliffe and Sir Anthony Morgan

1689–1801

Notes

References

Constituencies of the Parliament of Ireland (pre-1801)
Historic constituencies in County Wexford
1800 disestablishments in Ireland
Constituencies disestablished in 1800